"(Don't Fear) The Reaper" is a song by American rock band Blue Öyster Cult from the band's 1976 album Agents of Fortune. The song, written and sung by lead guitarist Donald "Buck Dharma" Roeser, deals with eternal love and the inevitability of death. Dharma wrote the song while picturing an early death for himself.

Released as an edited single (omitting the slow building interlude in the original), the song is Blue Öyster Cult's highest chart success, reaching #7 in Cash Box and #12 on the Billboard Hot 100 in late 1976. Critical reception was positive and in December 2003 "(Don't Fear) The Reaper" was listed at number 405 on Rolling Stones list of the top 500 songs of all time.

Background 

The song is about the inevitability of death and the foolishness of fearing it, and was written when Dharma was thinking about what would happen if he died at a young age. Lyrics such as "Romeo and Juliet are together in eternity" have led many listeners to interpret the song to be about a murder-suicide pact, but Dharma says the song is about eternal love, rather than suicide. He used Romeo and Juliet to describe a couple who wanted to be together in the afterlife.  He guessed that "40,000 men and women" died each day (from all causes), and the figure was used several times in the lyrics; but this number was about 100,000 too low.

Composition and recording 
"(Don't Fear) The Reaper" was written and sung by lead guitarist Buck Dharma and produced by David Lucas, Murray Krugman, and Sandy Pearlman. The song's distinctive guitar riff is built on the "I-bVII-bVI" chord progression, in an A minor scale. The riff was recorded with Krugman's Gibson ES-175 guitar, which was run through a Music Man 410 combo amplifier, and Dharma's vocals were captured with a Telefunken U47 tube microphone. The guitar solo and guitar rhythm sections were recorded in one take, while a four-track tape machine amplified them on the recording. Sound engineer Shelly Yakus remembers piecing together the separate vocals, guitar and rhythm section into a master track, with the overdubbing occurring in that order.

Mojo described its creation: "'Guys, this is it!' engineer Shelly Yakus announced at the end of the first take. 'The legendary once-in-a-lifetime groove!' ... What evolved in the studio was the extended solo section; it took them nearly as long to edit the five-minute track down to manageable length as it did to record it."

The song features prominent use of the cowbell percussion instrument, overdubbed on the original recording. Bassist Joe Bouchard remembered the producer requesting his brother, drummer Albert Bouchard, play the cowbell: "Albert thought he was crazy. But he put all this tape around a cowbell and played it. It really pulled the track together." However, producer David Lucas says that he played it; while bandmember Eric Bloom claims that he was the one to play it.

Reception 
The song was on the Billboard Hot 100 chart for 20 weeks, reaching number 12 for the weeks beginning November 6 and November 13 in 1976.  It was BÖC's highest-charting U.S. song and helped Agents of Fortune reach number 29 on the Billboard 200. "(Don't Fear) The Reaper" charted even higher in Canada, peaking at number 7. The single edit was released in the UK in July 1976 (CBS 4483) but failed to chart. However the unedited album version was released as a single (CBS 6333) in May 1978, where it reached number 16 on the UK Singles Chart.

Critical reaction was mostly positive.  Record World said that "An 'Eight Miles High' guitar line is complemented by smooth vocals." Denise Sullivan of Allmusic praised the song's "gentle vocals and virtuoso guitar" and "haunting middle break which delivers the listener straight back to the heart of the song once the thunder is finished". Nathan Beckett called it BÖC's "masterpiece" and compared the vocals to the Beach Boys. Writing for PopMatters, James Mann hailed it as a "landmark, genre-defining masterpiece" that was "as grand and emotional as American rock and roll ever got". Pitchfork Media also referred to the song as a "masterpiece".  "Extremely poetic" was the verdict of Fountains of Wayne founder Chris Collingwood. "A sad ballad about a man who wants to die with his true love before their love is spoiled by earthly things."'

Track listing 
7" Vinyl
"(Don't Fear) The Reaper" (Roeser) – 3:45
"Tattoo Vampire" (Albert Bouchard, Helen Robbins) – 2:40

Personnel 
Eric Bloom – guitar, backing vocals
Donald "Buck Dharma" Roeser – guitar, lead vocals
Allen Lanier – keyboards, guitar
Joe Bouchard – bass
Albert Bouchard – drums, percussion, cowbell 
with:
 Michael and Randy Brecker - horns (their contribution appears only on the extended album track and was edited out of the released single)
 David Lucas – backing vocals, keyboards, percussion

Charts

Certifications

The Mutton Birds version

New Zealand band The Mutton Birds recorded a version for the soundtrack of Peter Jackson's film The Frighteners. In 1997, it peaked at No.48 on the Australian ARIA singles charts, the only Mutton Birds single to chart in Australia.

Keep Shelly in Athens cover
Greek duo Keep Shelly in Athens released a version of the song in 2019  that was later included on the soundtrack of the 2020 film Unhinged, heard during the closing credits.

Accolades 
In 1976 Rolling Stone named "(Don't Fear) The Reaper" the song of the year and, in 2004, the magazine placed the song at number 397 on its list of "The 500 Greatest Songs of All Time"; however, the 2010 version of the list moved it down to number 405. In 1997 Mojo listed the song as the 80th best single of all time, while Q ranked "(Don't Fear) The Reaper" number 404 in its 2003 countdown of the "1001 Best Songs Ever."

When The Guardian released its unranked list of the "1000 Songs Everyone Must Hear" in 2009, the song was included. The publication wrote that the song's charm "lies in the disjuncture between its gothic storyline and the sprightly, Byrdsian guitar line that carries it." In his book The Heart of Rock and Soul: The 1001 Greatest Singles Ever Made, rock critic Dave Marsh ranked the song at number 997.

Legacy

"More Cowbell"

The song was memorialized in the April 2000 Saturday Night Live comedy sketch "More Cowbell". The six-minute sketch presents a fictionalized version of the recording of "(Don't Fear) The Reaper" on an episode of VH1's Behind the Music. Will Ferrell wrote the sketch and played Gene Frenkle, a cowbell player. "Legendary" producer Bruce Dickinson, played by Christopher Walken, asked Frenkle to "really explore the studio space" and up the ante on his cowbell playing. The rest of the band is visibly annoyed by Frenkle, but Dickinson tells everyone, "I got a fever, and the only prescription is more cowbell!" Buck Dharma said that the sketch was fantastic and he never gets tired of it but also lamented that it made the song lose its 'creepy' vibe for some time.

A segment of the song was performed by Red Hot Chili Peppers on May 22, 2014, as the conclusion of a drumming contest between the band's drummer Chad Smith and actor Will Ferrell. In a repeat of the 2000 SNL sketch, Ferrell again played cowbell for the rendition, which appeared on an episode of The Tonight Show Starring Jimmy Fallon.

In other media 

Stephen King cited the song as the inspiration for his novel The Stand, and its lyrics are quoted at the beginning of the novel. It also appears as the opening theme song for the 1994 TV miniseries based on the novel. It was subsequently used as the end credits music for the fifth episode of the 2020-21 miniseries adaptation.

In the 1994 book The Discworld Companion, written by Terry Pratchett and Stephen Briggs, the family motto of Mort of Sto Helit is revealed to be "Non Timetis Messor", dog Latin for "don't fear the reaper". This is referenced once more in Pratchett's 1997 novel Hogfather, the first reference in the mainline Discworld series. In 2010, Hubert Chesshyre designed Pratchett's coat of arms, which feature the motto "Noli Timere Messorem", a corrected Latin translation of "don't fear the reaper".

In the film Halloween, the song plays in the car when Jamie Lee Curtis and Nancy Kyes' characters, Laurie Strode and Annie Brackett, are being stalked by serial killer Michael Myers.  It is used again in the 2022 sequel Halloween Ends, playing over the final scene and ending credits. 

The 1994 film The Stoned Age features the song when one of the main characters criticizes the song as being "a pussy song" despite it being performed by Blue Oyster Cult.

The 2022 horror film X by A24 has the song playing on the protagonists' van radio at the film's climactic mid-point. The slasher nature of the scene, as well as the film's setting in 1979, suggests an intentional homage by director Ti West to Halloween.

The song was featured in the starting tracklist of the rhythm game Rock Band.

Variations of the song are used throughout the 2021 video game Returnal: the vocal melody played on a piano appears as a key memory of the protagonist, an expansion of that theme is played on an organ by one of the bosses, and the original song finally appears unaltered in a flashback sequence.

The 2006 video game Prey features the song, which is heard playing on a jukebox as Jen's bar is attacked.

The 2022 Netflix series 1899 features the song in Episode 4 before the end credits roll.

The 2013 Netflix series Orange Is the New Black features the song in Episode 26 (the last episode of Season 2) before the end credits roll.

Notes

References

1976 songs
1976 singles
1970s ballads
Blue Öyster Cult songs
Songs written by Buck Dharma
Song recordings produced by Sandy Pearlman
Songs about death
American soft rock songs
Fiction about personifications of death
Columbia Records singles
Hard rock ballads